Queen of Peace High School was a private, Roman Catholic, college-preparatory high school for girls in Burbank, Illinois, United States. It was established in 1962 by the Sinsinawa Dominican Sisters and was located in the Roman Catholic Archdiocese of Chicago. It closed on June 30, 2017, due to an extended enrollment decline and financial shortfalls.

History 
Queen of Peace High School was established in 1962 by the Sinsinawa Dominican Sisters. It used St. Laurence High School for the 1962–63 school year due to construction delays, and began classes in its own newly built facility in September 1963. The school closed on June 30, 2017, due to an extended enrollment decline and financial shortfalls.

Notable alumnae 
 Delilah DiCrescenzo, distance runner
 Jacqueline Janota, Softball player
 Robin Baumgarten, Television news personality

References

External links 
 

Burbank, Illinois
Private high schools in Cook County, Illinois
Preparatory schools in Illinois
Girls' schools in Illinois
Defunct Catholic secondary schools in Illinois
Dominican schools in the United States
Roman Catholic Archdiocese of Chicago
School buildings completed in 1963
Educational institutions established in 1962
1962 establishments in Illinois
Educational institutions disestablished in 2017
2017 disestablishments in Illinois